Ong Yew Sin (born 30 January 1995) is a Malaysian badminton player. He won a bronze medal with Teo Ee Yi at the 2021 BWF World Championships.

Career 
Together with Teo Ee Yi, they won the 2016 Bitburger Open and earned a silver and a bronze medal at the 2017 and 2019 Southeast Asian Games respectively. They were also runners-up at the 2019 Malaysia Masters.

In January 2020, they were dropped from the national team by the Badminton Association of Malaysia. Following the incident, they went on to win their first World Tour title at the 2020 Thailand Masters. They were also semifinalists at the 2021 Indonesia Masters and the 2021 BWF World Tour Finals.

Their best achievement was winning the men's doubles bronze medal at the 2021 BWF World Championships, where they had to go through a narrow fight against Olympic champions Lee Yang and Wang Chi-lin in the quarterfinals. Because of their achievements, they were selected to be part of the Malaysian squad in the 2022 Thomas Cup.

Achievements

BWF World Championships 
Men's doubles

Southeast Asian Games 
Men's doubles

BWF World Tour (1 title, 2 runners-up) 
The BWF World Tour, which was announced on 19 March 2017 and implemented in 2018, is a series of elite badminton tournaments sanctioned by the Badminton World Federation (BWF). The BWF World Tours are divided into levels of World Tour Finals, Super 1000, Super 750, Super 500, Super 300 (part of the HSBC World Tour), and the BWF Tour Super 100.

Men's doubles

BWF Grand Prix (1 title, 1 runner-up) 
The BWF Grand Prix had two levels, the Grand Prix and Grand Prix Gold. It was a series of badminton tournaments sanctioned by the Badminton World Federation (BWF) and played between 2007 and 2017.

Men's doubles

  BWF Grand Prix Gold tournament
  BWF Grand Prix tournament

BWF International Challenge/Series (5 titles, 1 runner-up) 
Men's doubles

Mixed doubles

  BWF International Challenge tournament
  BWF International Series tournament

References

External links 
 
 Ong Yew Sin at BAM.org.my

1995 births
Living people
People from Malacca
Malaysian sportspeople of Chinese descent
Malaysian male badminton players
Badminton players at the 2018 Asian Games
Asian Games competitors for Malaysia
Competitors at the 2017 Southeast Asian Games
Competitors at the 2019 Southeast Asian Games
Southeast Asian Games silver medalists for Malaysia
Southeast Asian Games bronze medalists for Malaysia
Southeast Asian Games medalists in badminton
21st-century Malaysian people